Gussage All Saints is a village and parish in the county of Dorset in southern England. It nestles within the East Dorset administrative district of the county, about 8 miles north-east of the town of Blandford Forum. It is sited by the side of a small stream in a shallow valley on the lower dip slope of Cranborne Chase. Ackling Dyke, a disused Roman road, crosses the valley to the northwest, and forms the parish boundary at that point.

The village church dates mostly from the early 14th century. Since 2001 The Ecclesiastical Parish of Gussage All Saints has been one of ten Ecclesiastical Parishes which form ‘The Chase Benefice’ under its first incumbent the Reverend Dr Michael Foster. The other Parishes are Gussage St Michael, Farnham, Chettle, Tarrant Gunville, Tarrant Hinton, Tarrant Monkton, Tarrant Rushton, Tarrant Keyneston, and Tollard Royal in Wiltshire.

To the south of the village lies an Iron Age settlement excavated in 1972 by Dr G. J. Wainwright, of the Department of the Environment. The settlement is formed by an enclosure that is roughly circular in plan and some 3 acres in extent, with a single entrance in the east defined by two pairs of flanking antennae ditches.

References

External links

Civil parishes in Dorset
Villages in Dorset